The Kamëntsá are an indigenous people of Colombia. They primarily live in the Sibundoy Valley of the Putumayo Department in the south of Colombia.

Name
The Kamëntsá also are known as the Camsá, Camëntsëá, Coche, Kamemtxa, Kamsa, Kamse, Sibundoy, and Sibundoy-Gaché people.

Language
The Camsá language is a language isolate, although linguists have tried to connect it to the Chibchan language family in the past. The language is written in the Latin script.

Culture
They are known for their carved wooden masks that are worn during ceremonies and festivals. They farm maize, beans, potatoes, and peas, and use a number of different entheogens, including ayahuasca (yagé), Brugmansia species, Iochroma fuchsioides and Desfontainia in their rituals. Kamëntsá shamans are noted for the number and variety of Brugmansia cultivars which they have propagated in their gardens of entheogenic plants, and which bear leaves in a wide variety of curiously misshapen forms. One of these cultivars - 'Culebra' ('snake' in Spanish) proved so aberrant that it was, for a time,  actually removed from Brugmansia and accorded monotypic genus status as Methysticodendron (Greek : 'intoxicating tree'), the full Linnaean binomial of the plant becoming Methysticodendron amesianum before it was subsumed once more in Brugmansia.

Notable Kamëntsá people
 Hugo Jamioy Juagibioy, poet and indigenous rights activist

References

External links

 Declaration by the Inga and Kametsa peoples, Colombia Support Network

Indigenous peoples in Colombia
Indigenous peoples of the Amazon